Fox Park Public Observatory   is an astronomical observatory owned and operated by the Eaton County Parks Department and local amateur astronomers.  Built in 1999, it is located in Fox Memorial Park near Potterville, Michigan (US).

See also
 List of observatories

References

External links
 Fox Park Public Observatory - official site
 Fox Park Public Observatory Clear Sky Clock Forecasts of observing conditions.

Astronomical observatories in Michigan
Public observatories
Buildings and structures completed in 1999
Buildings and structures in Eaton County, Michigan
Tourist attractions in Eaton County, Michigan
1999 establishments in Michigan